The 2005 New York City Marathon was the 36th running of the annual marathon race in New York City, United States, which took place on Sunday, November 6. The men's elite race was won by Kenya's Paul Tergat in a time of 2:09:29.9 hours, while the women's race was won by Latvia's Jeļena Prokopčuka in 2:24:41.

In the wheelchair races, South Africa's Ernst van Dyk (1:31:11) and Switzerland's Edith Hunkeler (1:54:17) won the men's and women's divisions, respectively. In the handcycle race, Australia's Todd Philpott (1:26:24) and Laura Stam (1:40:13) were the winners.

A total of 36,872 runners finished the race, 24,812 men and 12,060 women.

Results

Men

Women

 † Ran in mass race

Wheelchair men

Wheelchair women

Handcycle men

Handcycle women

References

Results
2005 New York Marathon Results. New York Road Runners. Retrieved 2020-05-17.
Men's results. Association of Road Racing Statisticians. Retrieved 2020-05-17.
Women's results. Association of Road Racing Statisticians. Retrieved 2020-05-17.

External links

New York Road Runners website

2005
New York City
Marathon
New York City Marathon